The Mittaghorn (also known as Tachaigne) is a mountain of the Bernese Alps, overlooking the Rawil Pass on the border between the cantons of Bern and Valais. It is located east of the Wildhorn.

References

External links
 Mittaghorn on Hikr

Mountains of the Alps
Mountains of Switzerland
Mountains of the canton of Bern
Mountains of Valais
Bern–Valais border
Two-thousanders of Switzerland